The mayor of Springfield is the highest ranking elected official in the city of Springfield, Missouri. Mayoral elections in Springfield are nonpartisan, and though the candidate may personally affiliate with a party, they do not appear on the ticket as a particular party's candidate. Since 1953 all mayoral elections have been voted on by the public, before then having been appointed by the city council. From 1861–1865, Springfield was ruled under martial law by Union and Confederate leaders during the American Civil War.

List of Mayors

Mayors of Note 

 Sempronius H. Boyd served as mayor of Springfield from 1858-1860, he became a member of the United States House of Representatives representing Missouri's 4th congressional district and was later Minister of the United States to Siam.
 Homer F. Fellows served as the city's only Whig mayor, later becoming an Abolitionist, then becoming a Republican.
 Bob Stephens served as the city's only Libertarian mayor, though elections are non-partisan.
 Elected as a Republican, W. E. Gilmore ran for congress as a Liberal Republican in 1870.
 Nathan Karchmer was the first and so far only Jewish mayor of Springfield.
 Thomas Carlson, having served seven terms, is the longest serving mayor in the city's history.

References

Government of Springfield, Missouri
Springfield